A spice bag (or spicebag, spicy bag, spice box or spicy box) is a fast food dish, popular in most of Ireland and inspired by Asian cuisine. The dish is most commonly sold in Chinese takeaways in Ireland. Typically, a spice bag consists of deep-fried salt and chilli chips, salt and chilli chicken (usually shredded, occasionally balls/wings), red and green peppers, sliced chili peppers, fried onions, and a variety of spices. A vegetarian or vegan option is often available, in which deep fried tofu takes the place of the shredded chicken. It is sometimes accompanied by a tub of curry sauce.

Available in Chinese takeaways and fish and chip shops since the 2010s, the dish has developed something of a cult following, and a Facebook group created as a tribute to the dish has attracted over 17,000 members. It is often cited as a popular "hangover cure". It was voted 'Ireland's Favourite Takeaway Dish' in the 2020 Just Eat National Takeaway Awards in the Republic of Ireland, while in 2021 Deliveroo Ireland started a petition to create a "National Spice Bag Day". The dish is not as common in Northern Ireland.


History 
According to RTÉ reporter Liam Geraghty, the dish was supposedly created in 2010 by The Sunflower Chinese takeaway in Templeogue, Dublin, with the first spice bag sold on Just Eat in 2012.

References

External links
 Spice Bag entry on TasteAtlas.com
Spice Bag Recipe on irishtimes.com

French fries
Irish cuisine
Chicken dishes
Deep fried foods
Irish chicken dishes